Betula pendula, commonly known as silver birch, warty birch, European white birch, or East Asian white birch, is a species of tree in the family Betulaceae, native to Europe and parts of Asia, though in southern Europe, it is only found at higher altitudes. Its range extends into Siberia, China, and southwest Asia in the mountains of northern Turkey, the Caucasus, and northern Iran. It has been introduced into North America, where it is known as the European white birch or weeping birch and is considered invasive in some states in the United States and parts of Canada. The tree can also be found in more temperate regions of Australia.

The silver birch is a medium-sized deciduous tree that owes its common name to the white peeling bark on the trunk. The twigs are slender and often pendulous and the leaves are roughly triangular with doubly serrate margins and turn yellow and brown in autumn before they fall. The flowers are catkins and the light, winged seeds get widely scattered by the wind. The silver birch is a hardy tree, a pioneer species, and one of the first trees to appear on bare or fire-swept land. Many species of birds and animals are found in birch woodland, the tree supports a wide range of insects and the light shade it casts allows shrubby and other plants to grow beneath its canopy. It is planted decoratively in parks and gardens and is used for forest products such as joinery timber, firewood, tanning, racecourse jumps, and brooms. Various parts of the tree are used in traditional medicine and the bark contains triterpenes, which have been shown to have medicinal properties.

Description

The bark on the trunk and branches is golden-brown at first, but later this turns to white as a result of papery tissue developing on the surface and peeling off in flakes, in a similar manner to the closely related paper birch (B. papyrifera). The bark remains smooth until the tree gets quite large, but in older trees, the bark thickens, becoming irregular, dark, and rugged. Young branches have whitish resin warts and the twigs are slender, hairless, and often pendulous. The buds are small and sticky, and development is sympodial – the terminal bud dies away and growth continues from a lateral bud. The species is monoecious with male and female catkins found on the same tree. Some shoots are long and bear the male catkins at the tip, while others are short and bear female catkins. The immature male catkins are present during the winter, but the female catkins develop in the spring, soon after the leaves unfurl.

They are sticky with resin at first, but this dries as they age, leaving small, white scales. The foliage is a pale to medium green and turns yellow early in the autumn before the leaves fall. In midsummer, the female catkins mature and the male catkins expand and release pollen, and wind pollination takes place. A catkin of Silver birch could produce an average of 1.66 million pollen grains. The seeds are very numerous and are separated by scales, and when ripe, the whole catkin disintegrates and the seeds are spread widely by the wind.

Silver birch can easily be confused with the similar downy birch (Betula pubescens). Yet, downy birches are characterised by hairy leaves and young shoots, whereas the same parts on silver birch are hairless. The leaf base of silver birch is usually a right angle to the stalk, while for downy birches, it is rounded. In terms of genetic structure, the trees are quite different, but do, however, occasionally hybridize.

Distribution and habitat
The silver birch grows naturally from western Europe eastwards to Kazakhstan, the Sakha Republic in Siberia, Mongolia, and the Xinjiang province in China, and southwards to the mountains of the Caucasus and northern Iran, Iraq, and Turkey. It is also native to northern Morocco and has become naturalised in some other parts of the world. In the southern parts of its range, it is mainly found in mountainous regions. Its light seeds are easily blown by the wind and it is a pioneer species, one of the first trees to sprout on bare land or after a forest fire. It needs plenty of light and does best on dry, acid soils and is found on heathland, mountainsides, and clinging to crags. Its tolerance to pollution make it suitable for planting in industrial areas and exposed sites. It has been introduced into North America, where it is known as the European white birch, and is considered invasive in the states of Kentucky, Maryland, Washington, and Wisconsin. It is naturalised and locally invasive in parts of Canada.

Taxonomy

Three subspecies of silver birch are accepted:
 Betula pendula subsp. pendula – Europe and eastwards to central Asia
 Betula pendula subsp. mandshurica (Regel) Ashburner & McAll. – eastern Asia and western North America; treated by some botanists as Betula platyphylla
 Betula pendula subsp. szechuanica (C.K.Schneid.) Ashburner & McAll. – western China, from Qinghai and Gansu to Yunnan and southeast Xizang, treated by some botanists as Betula szechuanica

B. pendula is distinguished from the related B. pubescens, the other common European birch, in having hairless, warty shoots (hairy and without warts in downy birch), more triangular leaves with double serration on the margins (more ovoid and with single serrations in downy birch), and whiter bark often with scattered black fissures (greyer, less fissured, in downy birch). It is also distinguished cytologically, silver birch being diploid (with two sets of chromosomes), whereas downy birch is tetraploid (four sets of chromosomes). Hybrids between the two are known, but are very rare, and being triploid, are sterile. The two have differences in habitat requirements, with silver birch found mainly on dry, sandy soils, and downy birch more common on wet, poorly drained sites such as clay soils and peat bogs. Silver birch also demands slightly more summer warmth than does downy birch, which is significant in the cooler parts of Europe. Many North American texts treat the two species as conspecific (and cause confusion by combining the downy birch's alternative vernacular name 'white birch', with the scientific name B. pendula of the other species), but they are regarded as distinct species throughout Europe.

Several varieties of B. pendula are no longer accepted, including B. pendula var. carelica, fontqueri, laciniata, lapponica, meridionalis, microlepis, and parvibracteata, as well as forms Betula pendula f. bircalensis, crispa, and palmeri. Other synonyms include:

Ecology
The silver birch has an open canopy which allows plenty of light to reach the ground. This allows a variety of mosses, grasses, and flowering plants to grow beneath, which in turn attract insects. Flowering plants often found in birch woods include primrose (Primula vulgaris), violet (Viola riviniana), bluebell (Hyacinthoides non-scripta), wood anemone (Anemone nemorosa), and wood sorrel (Oxalis acetosella). Small shrubs that grow on the forest floor include blaeberry (Vaccinium myrtillus) and cowberry (Vaccinium vitis-idaea).
Birds found in birch woodland include the chaffinch, tree pipit, willow warbler, nightingale, robin, woodcock, redpoll, and green woodpecker.

The branches of the silver birch often have tangled masses of twigs known as witch's brooms growing among them, caused by the fungus Taphrina betulina. Old trees are often killed by the decay fungus Fomitopsis betulina and fallen branches rot rapidly on the forest floor. This tree commonly grows with the mycorrhizal fungus Amanita muscaria in a mutualistic relationship. This applies particularly to acidic or nutrient-poor soils. Other mycorrhizal associates include Leccinum scabrum and Cantharellus cibarius. In addition to mycorrhiza, the presence of microfauna in the soil assists the growth of the tree, as it enhances the mobilization of nutrients.

The larvae of a large number of species of butterflies, moths, and other insects feed on the leaves and other parts of the silver birch. In Germany, almost 500 species of insects have been found on silver and downy birch including 106 beetles and 105 lepidopterans, with 133 insect species feeding almost exclusively on birch. Birch dieback disease can affect planted trees, while naturally regenerated trees seem less susceptible. This disease also affects B. pubescens and in 2000 was reported at many of the sites planted with birch in Scotland during the 1990s. In the United States, the wood is attacked by the bronze birch borer (Agrilus anxius), an insect pest to which it has no natural resistance.

Conservation
Betula pendula is considered a species of least concern by the IUCN Red List. The synonym Betula oycowiensis (as B. oycoviensis) was previously listed on the Red List as vulnerable, though it is now considered a synonym of B. pendula subsp. pendula. B. szaferi was previously considered extinct in the wild on the Red List, but is now considered a form of B. pendula with the presence of a mutant gene, causing it to grow weakly and fruit heavily.

Uses

The silver birch is Finland's national tree. Leafy, fragrant bunches of young silver birch boughs (called vihta or vasta) are used to gently beat oneself while bathing in the Finnish sauna. Silver birch is often planted in parks and gardens, grown for its white bark and gracefully drooping shoots, sometimes even in warmer-than-optimum places such as Los Angeles and Sydney.  In Scandinavia and other regions of northern Europe, it is grown for forest products such as lumber and pulp, as well as for aesthetic purposes and ecosystem services.  It is sometimes used as a pioneer and nurse tree elsewhere.

Silver birch wood is pale in colour with a light reddish-brown heartwood and is used in making furniture, plywood, veneers, parquet blocks, skis, and kitchen utensils, and in turnery. It makes a good firewood, but is quickly consumed by the flames. Slabs of bark are used for making roof shingles and strips are used for handicrafts such as bast shoes and small containers. Historically, the bark was used for tanning. Bark can be heated and the resin collected; the resin is an excellent waterproof glue and useful for starting fires. The thin sheets of bark that peel off young wood contain a waxy resin and are easy to ignite even when wet. The dead twigs are also useful as kindling for outdoor fires. The removal of bark was at one time so widespread that Carl Linnaeus expressed his concern for the survival of the woodlands.

Birch brushwood is used for racecourse jumps and besom brooms. In the spring, large quantities of sap rise up the trunk and this can be tapped. It contains around 1% sugars and can be used in a similar way to maple syrup, being drunk fresh, concentrated by evaporation, or fermented into a "wine".

Phytochemicals
The outer part of the bark contains up to 20% betulin. The main components in the essential oil of the buds are α-copaene (~10%), germacrene D (~15%), and δ-cadinene (~13%). Also present in the bark are other triterpene substances which have been used in laboratory research to identify its possible biological properties.

Medical uses 

Standardized allergen extract, white birch, sold under the brand name Itulatek, is indicated for the treatment of allergy to tree pollen from birch, alder and/or hazel and have allergic rhinitis (with or without conjunctivitis).

The combination of Betula pendula/Betula pubescens is used to treat epidermolysis bullosa.

Cultivation

Successful birch cultivation requires a climate cool enough for at least the occasional winter snowfall. As they are shallow-rooted, they may require water during dry periods. They grow best in full sun planted in deep, well-drained soil.

Cultivars and varieties
 'Carelica' or "curly birch" is called visakoivu in Finland. The wood is hard and burled throughout; it is prized for its decorative appearance and is used in wood-carving and as veneer.
 'Laciniata'  (commonly misidentified as 'Dalecarlica') has deeply incised leaves and weeping branches
 'Purpurea' has dark purple leaves
 'Tristis'  has an erect trunk with weeping branchlets
 'Youngii' has dense, twiggy, weeping growth with no central leader and requires being grafted onto a standard stem of normal silver birch.

References

External links 
 Betula pendula – distribution map, genetic conservation units and related resources. European Forest Genetic Resources Programme (EUFORGEN)

pendula
Flora of Europe
Trees of Russia
Trees of humid continental climate
National symbols of Finland
Trees of continental subarctic climate
Plants described in 1788
Taxa named by Albrecht Wilhelm Roth